Edward Idris Cassidy AC (5 July 1924 – 10 April 2021) was an Australian prelate of the Catholic Church who was president of the Pontifical Council for Promoting Christian Unity from 1989 to 2001. He headed the Commission of the Holy See for Religious Relations with the Jews. He spent most of his career in the diplomatic service of the Holy See both in Rome and overseas. He was made a cardinal in 1991.

Early life
Cassidy was born in Sydney on 5 July 1924. His parents were not Catholic and divorced while he was just one. When he was a student at Parramatta High School, a priest from St Felix's parish discouraged Cassidy from becoming a priest because he had not finished his secondary education, had not studied in Catholic schools and his family background was "unsuitable". Due to financial difficulties after his grandfather died, he left school to support his grandmother in 1939 and worked at the New South Wales Department of Road Transport as a junior clerk. In 1942, he presented his case for entering the seminary directly to Archbishop Norman Gilroy of Sydney, who accepted his arguments. Cassidy entered the local seminary, St Columba's Catholic College in Springwood, in February 1943.

Cassidy was ordained a priest of the Archdiocese of Sydney on 23 July 1949 at St Mary's Cathedral, Sydney, by Cardinal Gilroy. Edward Bede Clancy, like Cassidy a future cardinal, was ordained at the same time. He volunteered to transfer to the Diocese of Wagga Wagga and in January 1950 he was assigned to the small parish of Yenda.

Diplomatic service
In 1952, Bishop Francis Henschke of Wagga Wagga asked him if he would like to go to Rome to study canon law; he agreed and left for Rome on 1 September 1952. While studying in Rome, he resided at Collegio Sant'Apollinare, next to Piazza Navona. He completed his education studying at the Pontifical Lateran University in Rome, where he obtained a doctorate in canon law in July 1955 with a dissertation on the history and juridical nature of apostolic delegations, and at the Pontifical Ecclesiastical Academy, also in Rome, from October 1953, where he obtained a diploma in diplomatic studies. After finishing his studies, he joined the Vatican diplomatic service in July 1955.

He served in the nunciatures in India, Ireland, and Portugal. He was appointed counsellor of the apostolic delegation in the United States in June 1967, but as the nuncio in Ireland, Archbishop Giuseppe Sensi, was then transferred to the nunciature in Portugal, had to stay in Dublin until the following November, when he was named instead counselor of the nunciature in El Salvador, where he remained until the end of 1969, becoming then counselor of the nunciature in Argentina.

On 27 October 1970 he was appointed titular bishop of Amantia and Apostolic Pro-Nuncio to the Republic of China. He was consecrated on 15 November by Cardinal Jean-Marie Villot assisted by Archbishops Giovanni Benelli and Matthew Beovich, representing Cardinal Sergio Pignedoli. On 31 January 1973 he was named Apostolic Pro-Nuncio to Bangladesh. On 25 March 1979, Pope John Paul II appointed him Apostolic Delegate to Southern Africa and Apostolic Pro-Nuncio to Lesotho. His term as Apostolic Pro-Nuncio to China ended in April 1979; he was the last to hold that title. On 6 November 1984, he was appointed Apostolic Pro-Nuncio to the Netherlands.

Roman Curia
On 30 May 1988 he was appointed Substitute of the Secretariat of State in the Roman Curia. After only a year he was appointed president of the Pontifical Council for Promoting Christian Unity. In the consistory of 28 June 1991 Pope John Paul II created him Cardinal-Deacon of S. Maria in Via Lata. On 26 February 2002 he took the option open to cardinal deacons to be elevated to the rank of cardinal priest after ten years as a cardinal deacon.

In 1999, Cassidy was jointly responsible for the publication of the Joint Declaration on the Doctrine of Justification, widely received as a landmark achievement for ecumenism in bridging the centuries-long divide between Catholics and Lutherans. Reflecting on his involvement, Cassidy joked that signing it would be the one thing he could confidently cite on his behalf on judgement day.

Retirement
When he retired in 2001, he returned to his native Australia, where he substituted for local priests on occasion and served as chaplain to the Italian-speaking community of Newcastle.

His book titled Rediscovering Vatican II – Ecumenism and Interreligious Dialogue, was published 2005 and marked the 40th anniversary of the Vatican's ecumenism declaration Nostra aetate. The book made a significant contribution to ongoing international inter-religious dialogue.

Cassidy died in Newcastle, Australia, on 10 April 2021 at the age of 96.

Honours
In 1990, Cassidy was appointed a Companion of the Order of Australia (AC) in "recognition of service to the [sic] religion and to international affairs".

In 2006, the LDS Church in Australia presented Cassidy with an award for his efforts to bring better understanding to the people of the world. Presenting the "John Simpson Standing for Something" award to Cassidy for his role in building interfaith relations across the world, Mormon Elder Paul Sybrowsky said that "Latter-day Saints have seen that Cardinal Cassidy is indeed a man filled with faith and courage to help make this a better world for all to live in." In a message of congratulations, Premier Morris Iemma (also a Catholic) said that "no Australian has risen to greater eminence in the Catholic Church, and none has been such a devoted servant of the cause of ecumenism and inter-faith dialogue."

References

External links

 
 Cardinal Cassidy on Catholic hierarchy.org
 Interview with Cardinal Cassidy
 news item on his book

 

2021 deaths
20th-century Roman Catholic titular bishops
Australian people of Irish descent
1924 births
Australian cardinals
Pontifical Ecclesiastical Academy alumni
Companions of the Order of Australia
Cardinals created by Pope John Paul II
Pontifical Lateran University alumni
Apostolic Nuncios to the Netherlands
Apostolic Nuncios to Bangladesh
Apostolic Nuncios to South Africa
Australian expatriates in Taiwan